Diane Elizabeth Levin (born September 15, 1947) is an American author, educator, and advocate known for her work in media literacy and media effects on children.

Education 
Levin received her doctorate in Sociology of Education and Child Development from Tufts University in 1978.

Biography 

Levin is a professor of education at Wheelock College in Boston. She teaches courses on children's play, violence prevention and media literacy. Together with her colleague, Gail Dines, Levin teaches an annual summer seminar at Wheelock college. The institute: "Media Education in a Violent Society" was developed to address the effects of media violence on children.

Since 1985, Levin has been working with issues of violence in media culture and its effects on children, families, and schools. In March 1995, she visited New Zealand and led workshops, seminars, public meetings in the country's main cities and gave lectures and media interviews on the topic of war toys and children's play.

She is a founder of Teachers Resisting Unhealthy Children's Entertainment (TRUCE). Every year before the December holidays, TRUCE publishes a "Toy Action Guide" on their website. TRUCE also has a Media and Young Children Action Guide on line. Levin is also a founder of CCFC, the Campaign for a Commercial-Free Childhood and Defending the Early Years.

Companies, products, marketing practices and corporations criticized by Levin and the CCFC include, but are not limited to: BusRadio, Barbie, Channel One News, marketing in schools, marketing to infants and children under 8, and highly sexualized marketing.

Bibliography
PhD thesis
 

Books
 
 
 
 
 
 
 

 Levin also blogs for The Huffington Post.

References

External links
 Teaching Resisting Unhealthy Children's Entertainment (TRUCE)
 Campaign for a Commercial-Free Childhood (CCFC)
 Defending the Early Years (DEY)

1947 births
American women writers
Living people
Wheelock College faculty
American women academics
21st-century American women